George James Nicholls (13 December 1890 – 1970) was an English footballer who played as a winger for Southend United and Rochdale.

References

Rochdale A.F.C. players
Southend United F.C. players
English footballers
1890 births
1970 deaths
Footballers from Bethnal Green
Association footballers not categorized by position